is a Japanese manga series written and illustrated by Shinobu Kaitani. It was first serialized in Kodansha's seinen manga magazine Weekly Young Magazine March 2019 to June 2020 and later on the Comic Days manga application from July 2020 to September 2021, with its chapters collected in eight tankōbon volumes. A television drama adaptation premiered in July 2022.

Characters

Akechi Mitsuhide

Ii Naomasa

Takenaga Shigeharu

Honda Tadakatsu

Katō Kiyomasa

Sakai Tadatsugu

Sakakibara Yasumasa

Mōri Motonari

Maeda Toshiie

Sanada Yukimura

Imagawa Yoshimoto

Ryūzōji Takanobu

Media

Manga
Written and illustrated by Shinobu Kaitani, Shin Shinchō Kōki: Nobunaga-kun to Watashi was serialized in Kodansha's seinen manga magazine Weekly Young Magazine March 25, 2019, to June 15, 2020. The series was later transferred to the Comic Days manga application, where it ran from July 6, 2020, to September 6, 2021. Kodansha collected its chapters in eight tankōbon volumes, released from July 5, 2019. to November 18, 2021.

Volume list

Drama
In May 2022, it was announced that the series would receive a television drama adaptation which premiered on July 24 of the same year.

References

External links
 
 

Kodansha manga
Science fiction anime and manga
Seinen manga
Yankī anime and manga